Vicente Parras Campello (born 18 November 1975) is a Spanish retired footballer who played as a central defender, and is the manager of CD Alcoyano.

Coaching career
Born in Alicante but raised in Elche, also in the Valencian Community, Parras only played football at regional level. He started his managerial career at the age of just 16, coaching ACD Caja de Elche's youth sides.

Parras joined Elche CF in 2010, after stints at Torrellano CF, Hércules CF and Torrellano Illice CF. In 2012, he was named Vicente Mir's assistant at Elche CF Ilicitano, a position he retained for three years.

On 13 August 2015, following a short spell as an interim after Óscar Cano's resignation, Parras was named manager of the reserves. On 29 April 2017, he was promoted to the first team in place of the fired Alberto Toril.

Parras' first professional match occurred on 6 May 2017, a 0–1 Segunda División away loss against RCD Mallorca. Subsequently, he had two separate spells in Segunda División B with neighbouring Ontinyent CF, leaving in March 2019 after the club's dissolution.

In June 2019, Parras was hired by CD Alcoyano in the Tercera División. He won all ten of his first fixtures, equalling a record in the history of Group VI of the league.

Managerial statistics

References

External links

1971 births
Living people
People from Alicante
Spanish footballers
Footballers from the Valencian Community
Association football defenders
Divisiones Regionales de Fútbol players
Spanish football managers
Segunda División managers
Primera Federación managers
Segunda División B managers
Tercera División managers
Elche CF Ilicitano managers
Elche CF managers
CD Alcoyano managers